Persatuan Sepakbola Indonesia Garut Selatan (simply known as Persigarsel) is an Indonesian football club based in Garut Regency, West Java. They currently compete in the Liga 3.

References

External links

Garut Regency
Sport in West Java
Football clubs in Indonesia
Football clubs in West Java
Association football clubs established in 2019
2019 establishments in Indonesia
Association football clubs disestablished in 2022